John T. "Jackie" Moore (born September 24, 1932) is a retired American professional basketball player.

A 6'5" small forward from La Salle University, Moore played three seasons (1954–1957) in the National Basketball Association as a member of the Syracuse Nationals, Milwaukee Hawks, and Philadelphia Warriors.  He averaged 2.7 points per game in his NBA career and won a league championship in 1956.

External links

1932 births
Living people
American men's basketball players
La Salle Explorers men's basketball players
Milwaukee Hawks players
Philadelphia Warriors players
Small forwards
Sunbury Mercuries players
Syracuse Nationals players
Undrafted National Basketball Association players
Basketball players from Philadelphia